NetMind Technologies was an Internet software company founded in February 1996 by Matt Freivald, Mark Richards and Alan Noble.

The company pioneered Internet change detection and notification (CDN) at a time when most companies were still focused on Internet search.  For example, NetMind was the first company to develop so-called persistent search for automatically notifying users of changed search results, a capability developed only much later in products such as Google Alerts.

NetMind started at the Tech Farm Ventures incubator in Sunnyvale and then rapidly expanded into a headquarters in Campbell and an engineering office in Santa Cruz, California, growing to 60 employees. NetMind's popular "Mind-it" change detection and notification service amassed over 6 million users in less than 4 years. The product was also used by companies like Boeing, eBay, etc. 

In May 1999, NetMind was named one of Upside Magazine's Hot 100 industry startups.

In February 2000, NetMind was acquired by Puma Technologies later renamed Intellisync and in turn acquired by Nokia in 2005.

NetMind was granted five US patents in the area of change detection.  Change detection and notification (CDN) is assigned to TCP/IP port 2412 with IANA port numbers.

Patents
6,219,818 Checksum-comparing change-detection tool indicating degree and location of change of internet documents
 

6,012,087 Unique-change detection of dynamic web pages using history tables of signatures 

5,983,268 Spreadsheet user-interface for an internet-document change-detection tool

5,978,842 Distributed-client change-detection tool with change-detection augmented by multiple clients

5,898,836 Change-detection tool indicating degree and location of change of internet documents by comparison of CRC signatures

External links
 ChangeDetect

References

Defunct online companies
Companies established in 1996
Change detection and notification